Philophrosyne  was the ancient Greek female spirit of welcome, friendliness, and kindness. Her sisters were Euthenia, Eupheme, and Eucleia. Along with her sisters, she was regarded as a member of the younger Charites. According to the Orphic fragments, Philophrosyne was the daughter of Hephaestus and Aglaia.

References
Geffcken, Johannes, The Last Days of Greco-Roman Paganism, North Holland Pub. Co., 1978. . p. 251.
Oliver, James Henry, Demokratia, the gods, and the free world, Ayer Publishing, 1979. . p. 111.

Personifications in Greek mythology
Greek goddesses
Children of Hephaestus